Rongali Utsav is a festival organised in Guwahati every year. The festival showcases tribal culture of Assam to the world.

References 

Festivals in Assam
Culture of Assam
Festivals in India
Cultural festivals in India